George Hood may refer to:

 George Hood (aviator), New Zealand aviator who vanished while attempting the first flight from Australia to New Zealand, 1928
 George Hood (Massachusetts politician) (1806–1859), Massachusetts politician
 George E. Hood (1875–1960), U.S. Representative from North Carolina
 George Hood, former U.S. Marine and isometric exercise record-holder